The 2017–18 Binghamton Bearcats women's basketball team represented Binghamton University during the 2017–18 NCAA Division I women's basketball season. The Bearcats, led by fourth year head coach Linda Cimino, played their home games at Binghamton University Events Center as members of the America East Conference. They finished the season 20–12, 10–6 in the America East. They earned a bye through the quarterfinals in the conference tournament, where they lost to Hartford in overtime. They received an invitation to play in the 2018 WBI, beating Youngstown State before losing to Yale in the quarterfinals.

On May 18, Cimino resigns to become a new head coach at St. Francis Brooklyn. She finished at Binghamton with a four year record of 51–72.

Media
All home games and conference road games will stream on either ESPN3 or AmericaEast.tv. Most road games will stream on the opponents website. All games will be broadcast on the radio on WNBF and streamed online.

Roster

Schedule

|-
!colspan=9 style="background:#; color:white;"| Non-conference regular season

|-
!colspan=9 style="background:#; color:white;"| America East regular season

|-
!colspan=9 style="background:#; color:white;"| America East Women's Tournament

|-
!colspan=9 style="background:#; color:white;"| WBI

See also
2017–18 Binghamton Bearcats men's basketball team

References

Binghamton Bearcats women's basketball seasons
Binghamton
Binghamton Bearcats women's basketball
Binghamton Bearcats women's basketball
Binghamton